Flora Mountain is a mountain summit in Washington in the Cascade Range in Washington state near the shores of Lake Chelan and  south of the Canada–US border in the Glacier Peak Wilderness.

It has been described as a "desolate pile of loose gneiss."

References

External links
 
 

Mountains of Washington (state)
Mountains of Chelan County, Washington